Zyklon is a Norwegian industrial blackened death metal band.

Zyklon may also refer to:

Chemicals
 Zyklon A, a pesticide originally known as Zyklon
 Zyklon B, a pesticide ultimately used by Nazi Germany in gas chambers

Arts and entertainment
 Zyklon, roller coaster manufactured by Pinfari
 Zyklon, comic book character, see list of DC Comics characters: Z

See also
 Cyklon, German car
 Cyclone, weather phenomenon